Nuestra Belleza Latina 2013 was the seventh season of Nuestra Belleza Latina and the seventh season to be aired on Univision. The season premiere was on March 10, 2013 at 8pm/7c and was aired every Sunday.

The auditions were shown on the first show, prior to the final 12 are revealed. Auditions were held January through February 4, 2013 in seven major US cities (New York City, New York; Chicago, Illinois; Houston, Texas; Phoenix, Arizona; San Jose, California; Los Angeles, California; and Miami, Florida) and in San Juan, Puerto Rico. During the audition process, about 75 young women were given passes to the semi-finals in Miami. Two contestants were chosen from online Auditions, with the help of public votes.

The winner of the contest will be awarded a contract to be one of the new personality faces on many of Univision's programs and award shows; a chance to win more than $250,000 in cash and prizes; a brand new car - Kia Forte; appear on the cover of Cosmopolitan en Español magazine and reign as Nuestra Belleza Latina for a year. This was the last season for Giselle Blondet to host.

The winner of Nuestra Belleza Latina 2013 was Marisela Demontecristo from El Salvador.

2013 Judges

Changes and contestants
For the first time in Nuestra Belleza Latina the Top 30 girls chosen in the auditions were taken on an international trip by their respective judge. Osmel took his girls to Canada, Lupita took her girls to Mexico and Julian took his girls to Puerto Rico.

Contestants

Elimination table

 The contestant won the week's reward challenge.
 The contestant was in the bottom three, but was saved by the other contestants.
 The contestant was in the bottom two.
 The contestant won the week's reward challenge and was eliminated.
 The contestant was eliminated.
 The contestant won the week's reward challenge and was in the bottom three, but was saved by the other contestants.
 The contestant was a finalist, but did not win.
 The contestant was the runner-up.
 The contestant won Nuestra Belleza Latina 2013.

Shows
2013 Auditions:

Top 12 Contestants Notes
 Barbara Turbay won Miss Mundo Colombia 2012 and represented Colombia at Miss World 2012 where she made it to the Top 30.
 Audris Rijo won Miss Turismo Dominicana 2009 representing La Altagracia. She also competed in Reinado Internacional del Café 2010 and placed as 2nd Runner-Up, there she won special awards, Queen of the Water and Best Face. She had also made it to the Top 24 in Nuestra Belleza Latina 2011
 Marisela Demontecristo won Miss Carnaval San Miguel Las Vegas 2012, later won Reinado de El Salvador 2018 which gave her the right to represent El Salvador at Miss Universe 2018 where she was unplaced.
 Barbara Falcon competed in Miss Texas USA 2012 representing Southwest Texas and placed as 3rd Runner Up. She had also won Miss Laredo Texas 2009, Miss Laredo Teen 2005 and was a finalist in Miss Texas Teen USA 2005. She was elected as Nuestra Belleza Tamaulipas 2013 and placed as a semifinalist in Nuestra Belleza México 2013. She compete in Miss Texas USA 2015 and 2016 placing 2nd runner up and 1st runner up before aging out respectively. 
 Zuleyka Silver competed in Model Latina 2009 and finished in 3rd place. She is also an actress in Los Angeles and has appeared in numerous films and music videos.
 Lilia Fifield competed in the 3rd cycle of Mexico's Next Top Model and finished in 12th place.
 Essined Aponte had previously competed in Nuestra Belleza Latina 2012 and was voted off in the Top 24.
 Viviana Ortiz won Miss Universe Puerto Rico 2011 and represented Puerto Rico at Miss Universe 2011 where she made it to the Top 16.

Winners

References

External links 
 Nuestra Belleza Latina - Official Page 
 Nuestra Belleza Latina at Univision.com 
 

Univision original programming
Nuestra Belleza Latina